Sir Thomas Wallace Russell, 1st Baronet  (28 February 1841 – 2 May 1920), was an Irish politician and agrarian agitator. Born at Cupar, Fife, Scotland, he moved to County Tyrone at the age of eighteen. He was secretary and parliamentary agent of the Irish temperance movement and became well known as an anti-alcohol campaigner and proprietor of a Temperance Hotel in Dublin.

Career 

He unsuccessfully contested Preston in 1885 as a Liberal. However, he opposed William Ewart Gladstone's Home Rule policy and was elected to the House of Commons of the United Kingdom of Great Britain and Ireland as a Liberal Unionist in 1886 for South Tyrone. He served between 1895 and 1900 as Parliamentary Secretary to the Local Government Board in the Unionist administration of Lord Salisbury.

However, Russell's views on Home Rule underwent a change around the turn of the century and he gradually became a critic of Unionist policies in Ireland. From 1900 put himself at the head of the Farmers and Labourers Union, an Ulster tenant-farmer protest movement demanding compulsory land purchase, similar to the land and labour movement in the south. His 1901 book Ireland and the Empire was an attack on the Irish agrarian system. From 1902 to 1903 he was a key Ulster farmer representative at the Dublin "Land Conference" which resulted in the passing of the Land Purchase (Ireland) Act 1903. This defused the Protestant tenant farmers' revolt.

Russell continued to represent Tyrone South in Parliament. In 1906, supported by Lindsay Crawford and his Independent Orange Order while at the same acknowledging his debt to Catholic tenant farmers, he was re-elected as an "Independent Unionist", one of several candidates referred to as "Russellite Unionist".

Russell was vice-president of the Irish Department of Agriculture and Technical Instruction (DATI), in which capacity he displaced Horace Plunkett as head of the Department in 1907. He disapproved of Plunkett's cooperative Irish Agricultural Organisation Society involving itself in the affairs of farmers, and ended DATI's help for the society.

He rejoined the Liberal Party and stood as a Liberal candidate at the general election in January 1910, when he lost his seat to the Unionist Andrew Horner. Russell does not appear to have contested the December 1910 general election, but in 1911 he won a by-election in Tyrone North, a seat he held until the constituency was abolished in 1918.

Russell was sworn of the Irish Privy Council in 1908 and created a Baronet, of Olney in the County of Dublin, in 1917. He retired from politics in 1918 and died in Dublin on 2 May 1920, aged 79, when the baronetcy became extinct.

Arms

Notes

External links

1841 births
1920 deaths
Russell, Sir Thomas Wallace, 1st Baronet
Irish Presbyterians
Members of the Parliament of the United Kingdom for County Tyrone constituencies (1801–1922)
UK MPs 1886–1892
UK MPs 1892–1895
UK MPs 1895–1900
UK MPs 1900–1906
UK MPs 1906–1910
UK MPs 1910–1918
Liberal Unionist Party MPs for Irish constituencies
Irish Liberal Party MPs
Members of the Privy Council of Ireland
Irish land reform activists
People from Cupar
19th-century Presbyterians
Russellite Unionist MPs